Rodì Milici (Sicilian: Rudìa Milici) is an Italian comune in the Metropolitan City of Messina in Sicily.

Rodì Milici borders the following municipalities: Antillo, Castroreale, Fondachelli-Fantina, Mazzarrà Sant'Andrea, Novara di Sicilia, Terme Vigliatore.

See also
Milici, Italy

References

External links

View from Mt. Nicoletta (above Milici).

Cities and towns in Sicily